Ali Va (also Romanized as ‘Alī Vā; also known as ‘Alīābād and ‘Alī Veh) is a village in Deylaman Rural District, Deylaman District, Siahkal County, Gilan Province, Iran. At the 2006 census, its population was 115, in 41 families.

References 

Populated places in Siahkal County